Lars Lindemann (born 9 May 1971) is a German lawyer and politician of the Free Democratic Party who has served as a member of the Bundestag from 2009 to 2013 and again since 2021.

Early life and education
Lindemann was born 1971 in the East German town of Herzberg.

Political career
From 2009 to 2013, Lindemann was a member of the Bundestag, representing the Berlin-Tempelhof-Schöneberg district. During that time, he served on the Health Committee.

In 2017, Lindemann was one of the candidates to become chair of the Federal Joint Committee (GBA).

Lindemann became a member of the Bundestag again in the 2021 elections. He joined the Health Committee again.

References 

Living people
1971 births
Free Democratic Party (Germany) politicians
21st-century German politicians
Members of the Bundestag 2021–2025